Myristica iners is a species of tree in the family Myristicaceae. It is a tree found in Cambodia, Thailand and throughout Malesia: Sumatra, Peninsular Malaysia, Java, Borneo and possibly the Philippines.

References

iners
Trees of Singapore
Trees of Borneo
Least concern plants
Taxonomy articles created by Polbot